Hexobendine is a vasodilator that acts as an adenosine reuptake inhibitor.

Synthesis

The reaction between 3,4,5-trimethoxybenzoyl chloride [4521-61-3] (1) and 3-chloropropanol [627-30-5] (2) gives the corresponding ester, i.e. 3-chloropropyl 3,4,5-trimethoxybenzoate, CID:12350731 [1029-24-9] (3). The last step involves the reaction between two molar equivalents of 3 with one molar equivalent of N,N’-dimethylethanediamine [110-70-3] (4) completing the synthesis of hexobendine (5).

See also  
 Dilazep

References 

Vasodilators
Phenol ethers
Benzoate esters
Amines
Adenosine reuptake inhibitors